is a tram station in Kōchi, Japan.It is only 63 meters from the neighboring Ichijobashi Station, which is the shortest distance between adjacent stations in Japan.

Lines
Tosa Electric Railway
Gomen Line

Adjacent stations

|-
!colspan=5|Tosa Electric Railway

External links

Railway stations in Kōchi Prefecture
Railway stations in Japan opened in 1985